is a Japanese singer, voice actress, and drummer from Ibaraki Prefecture, Japan. She is better known as Tsubasa Kira from Love Live! and Ako Udagawa from BanG Dream!, the latter of which involves playing drums for the band Roselia. She is currently affiliated with S.

Works

Anime
Armed Blue Gunvolt – Cyan, Morpho
BanG Dream! – Ako Udagawa
Love Live! School Idol Project Series – Kira Tsubasa
Teppen!!!!!!!!!!!!!!! Laughing 'til You Cry – Miyu Komatsuzaki
Wagamama High Spec – Sakuragi Ashe Rufflette
Yahari Ore no Seishun Love Comedy wa Machigatteiru. – Yokko and Yukko

Games
BanG Dream! Girls Band Party! – Ako Udagawa
Mahou Shoujo Lyrical Nanoha A's PORTABLE -THE BATTLE OF ACES-
Idol Incidents – Kazuna Yasuda
Corpse Seed 3 – Rinon Durandal
Corpse Seed 3: Heartclub Extreme – Rinon Durandal
Corpse Seed 4: Endless Brawl – Rinon Durandal
Hakoniwa No Folclore – Majo Korone
Azure Striker Gunvolt – Joule/Lumen
Azure Striker Gunvolt 2 – Joule
Azure Striker Gunvolt 3 – Lumen

Songs

"Brave Blade" (Campione! opening)
"Private Wars" (with Maho Matsunaga, Ayuru Ohashi)
"Shocking Party" (with Maho Matsunaga, Ayuru Ohashi)
"Unreal Creation!" (Hamidashi Creative opening)

References

1988 births
Living people
Voice actresses from Ibaraki Prefecture
Japanese video game actresses
Japanese voice actresses
People from Sakuragawa, Ibaraki
21st-century Japanese actresses
21st-century Japanese singers
21st-century Japanese women singers
A-Rise members